Ionia Township is a township in Jewell County, Kansas, USA.  As of the 2000 census, its population was 100.

Geography
Ionia Township covers an area of 39.52 square miles (102.35 square kilometers); of this, 0.04 square miles (0.11 square kilometers), or 0.11 percent, is water. The streams of Elm Creek and Gimlet Creek run through the township.

Unincorporated towns
 Ionia
(This list is based on USGS data and may include former settlements.)

Adjacent townships
 Limestone Township (north)
 Center Township (northeast)
 Calvin Township (east)
 Browns Creek Township (southeast)
 Athens Township (south)
 Erving Township (southwest)
 Odessa Township (west)
 Esbon Township (northwest)

Cemeteries
The township contains one cemetery, Ionia.

Major highways
 K-128

References
 U.S. Board on Geographic Names (GNIS)
 United States Census Bureau cartographic boundary files

External links
 US-Counties.com
 City-Data.com

Townships in Jewell County, Kansas
Townships in Kansas